is a Japanese shōjo/josei manga written and illustrated by Chiho Saito in 1990. The story is set in late 1930s Asia, on the eve of World War II.

Characters
 Koto, a Japanese girl who aspires to be a tailor
 Sajit Aster, an Indian freedom fighter struggling for independence against British Empire
 Masaomi Kidoin, a Japanese imperial soldier serving the Japanese Empire
 Ryuichi Kidoin, Masaomi's elder brother

References

External links 
 

1990 manga
1994 manga
British Empire in fiction
British India in fiction
Chiho Saito
Comics set in China
History of Manchuria in comics
Indian independence movement fiction
Japan in fiction
Shōjo manga
Comics set during World War II
Shogakukan manga